David B. Feldman, Ph.D. is an associate professor of psychology at Santa Clara University. His research focuses on hope, meaning, and growth in the face of life's difficulties, and he has been instrumental in developing Hope Therapy and applying it to various populations.

Education and academic career
Feldman received a bachelor's degree from DePauw University and a Ph.D. in clinical psychology (2004) from the University of Kansas.  He conducted his post-doctoral healthy fellowship at the VA Palo Alto Health Care System (2004-2005).

Feldman has been an Associate Professor (2005–present) at Santa Clara University's graduate department of Counseling Psychology.  Additionally, Feldman has taught in Santa Clara University's Center for Professional Development (2006–present), a continuing education program.  Feldman has held supervision positions at the VA Palo Alto Health Care System (2004-2005) and the University of Kansas (2000-2003).

Awards and accolades
“Great Psychology Book” of the month by all-about-psychology.com for Speaking for Psychologists. (March 2010)
Irving-Handelsman Graduate Student Teaching Award, University of Kansas (2002)

Research
Feldman's research has focused on:
Hope: research, measurement, and treatment applications
Maintenance and growth of hope and meaning in the face of physical illness, trauma, and other highly stressful events.
Interventions derived from positive-psychology constructs

Publications and media
Feldman has authored numerous articles and book chapters as well as presented nationally and internationally. Feldman has been interviewed in SELF, U.S. News & World Report, and Ode, has had his work featured on WebMD.com and About.com, and has appeared on national radio.  Additionally, Feldman has co-authored two books:
Feldman, D. B., & Silvia, P. J. (2010). Public speaking for psychologists: A lighthearted guide to research presentations, job talks, and other opportunities to embarrass yourself. Washington, DC: American Psychological Association. 
Feldman, D. B., & Lasher, S. A., Jr. (2008). The end-of-life handbook: A compassionate guide to connecting with and caring for a dying loved one. Oakland, CA: New Harbinger Publications.

Professional memberships
Association for Behavioral and Cognitive Therapies
American Psychological Association
Society for Behavioral Medicine

References

External links 

http://davidfeldmanphd.com/

21st-century American psychologists
Living people
Santa Clara University faculty
University of Kansas alumni
Positive psychologists
Year of birth missing (living people)